Agrotis submolesta is a moth of the family Noctuidae. It is found in Mongolia.

External links
Biodiversity of Altai-Sayan Ecoregion

Agrotis
Moths of Asia